The 2017 Northern NSW Football season was the fourth season under the new competition format in northern New South Wales.

League tables

2017 National Premier League Northern NSW

Finals

2017 NEWFM Northern League One

The NEWFM Northern League One (formerly Northern NSW State League Division 1) season was the fourth season of the new Northern NSW State League Division 1 as the second level domestic association football competition in the district of Northern NSW. The top team at the end of the year can be promoted to the 2017 National Premier Leagues Northern NSW, subject to meeting criteria.

Finals

2017 Zone Premier League

The 2017 Zone Premier League season was the fourth edition of the Newcastle Zone Premier League as the third level domestic football competition in the district of Northern NSW.

Finals

2017 Zone League 1

The 2017 Zone League 1 season was the fourth edition of the Zone League 1 as the fourth level domestic football competition in the district of Northern NSW.

Finals

2017 Zone League 2

The 2017 Zone League 2 season was the fourth edition of the Zone League 2 as the fifth level domestic football competition in the district of Northern NSW.

Finals

2017 Zone League 3

The 2017 Zone League 3 season was the fourth edition of the Zone League 3 as the sixth level domestic football competition in the district of Northern NSW.

Finals

2017 Women's Premier League

The highest tier domestic football competition in Northern NSW for women is known for sponsorship reasons as the Herald Women's Premier League.

Cup Competitions

FFA Cup Preliminary rounds

Northern NSW soccer clubs competed in 2017 within the Northern NSW Preliminary rounds for the 2017 FFA Cup. In addition to the A-League club Newcastle Jets, the two Round 7 winners - Broadmeadow Magic and Edgeworth FC - qualified for the final rounds of the FFA Cup, entering at the Round of 32, where they were both eliminated.

References

2017 in Australian soccer